Ljubija may refer to:

Ljubija (town), a small town in the municipality of Prijedor, Bosnia-Herzegovina
Ljubija (Ljubljanica), a source affluent of the Ljubljanica, a river in Slovenia.
Ljubljanica, a river in Slovenia, known in the Middle Ages as Ljubija.
Ljubija, Mozirje, a settlement in the Municipality of Mozirje, Slovenia.